Wandisile Simelane (born 21 March 1998) is a South African professional rugby union player for the  in Super Rugby, the  in the Currie Cup and the  in the Rugby Challenge. His regular position is centre or wing.

References

South African rugby union players
Living people
1998 births
Rugby union players from Johannesburg
Rugby union centres
Rugby union wings
Golden Lions players
South Africa Under-20 international rugby union players
Lions (United Rugby Championship) players
Bulls (rugby union) players
Blue Bulls players